Eckhard Christian (1 December 1907 – 3 January 1985) was a Luftwaffe officer in World War II, and rose to the rank of Generalmajor. On 2 February 1943, he married Gerda Daranowski who was one of Adolf Hitler's private secretaries during World War II. Christian was captured by British troops on 8 May 1945 and held in custody until 7 May 1947.

Biography 
Eckhard Christian was born in Charlottenburg (Berlin). He first joined the Reichsmarine (German Navy) in 1926. In 1928 and 1929, he attended officer candidate courses. Thereafter, he continued in the navy and obtained the rank of Leutnant zur See (second lieutenant) on 1 October 1930. In 1934, Christian transferred to the Luftwaffe (German Air force) glider school in Warnemünde. He was promoted to the rank of Hauptmann (captain) on 1 April 1935. He was transferred to the Air Ministry in July 1938 and onto the General Staff. On 1 June 1940, he was promoted to major and from 15 January 1941 was attached to Chief of the Armed Forces Command Staff at Adolf Hitler's Führer HQ. Christian was promoted to Oberstleutnant (lieutenant colonel) on 15 March 1942.

It was there at Hitler's HQ that Christian met Gerda "Dara" Daranowski, who was working as one of Adolf Hitler's private secretaries. They were married on 2 February 1943 and Gerda Christian took a break from her employment for Hitler. Her work was taken over by Traudl Junge. Christian was promoted to Oberst (colonel) on 1 March 1943. In mid-1943, Gerda Christian returned to Hitler's staff as one of his private secretaries. After the suicide of Generaloberst Hans Jeschonnek, when the latter was replaced by Günther Korten, Christian was appointed to the Luftwaffe Command Staff at Hitler's request. One year later, he was promoted to Generalmajor and made Chef des Luftwaffe-Führungsstabes (Chief of the Luftwaffe Command Staff) at Hitler's request on 1 September 1944.

In April 1945, Christian was stationed in Berlin at the Führerbunker HQ. He left the bunker complex on 22 April 1945 to become chief of the liaison staff of the Luftwaffe to OKW Command Staff North. His wife, Gerda, was one of two secretaries who volunteered to remain with Hitler in the Führerbunker.

On 8 May 1945, he surrendered to British troops in Mürwik and was held in custody until 7 May 1947. Gerda did not ever reunite with her husband after the war ended. In fact, Gerda divorced Christian in 1946 because he did not remain with her in the Führerbunker until after the death of Hitler. Christian died on 3 January 1985 in Bad Kreuznach.

Awards 
 German Cross in Silver on 10 May 1945 as Generalmajor and chief of the Luftwaffen-Führungsstab and Verbindungskommando zum OKW-Stab
 Iron Cross (1939), 1st and 2nd Class
 War Merit Cross (1939), 1st and 2nd class with Swords
 Narvik Shield
 Order of the Cross of Liberty, 2nd Class with Swords on 18 August 1943
 Flugzeugführerabzeichen
 Wehrmacht Long Service Award (Wehrmacht-Dienstauszeichnung), IV. and III. Class

See also 

 Air warfare of World War II
 Glossary of Nazi Germany
 Glossary of German military terms

References

Citations

Bibliography
 
 
Patzwall, Klaus D. and Scherzer, Veit (2001). Das Deutsche Kreuz 1941 – 1945 Geschichte und Inhaber Band II (in German). Norderstedt, Germany: Verlag Klaus D. Patzwall. .

1907 births
1985 deaths
People from Charlottenburg
People from the Province of Brandenburg
Reichsmarine personnel
Major generals of the Luftwaffe
Luftwaffe World War II generals
Luftwaffe pilots
Recipients of the Iron Cross (1939), 1st class
Recipients of the Order of the Cross of Liberty, 2nd Class